A nut driver is a tool for tightening nuts and bolts. It essentially consists of a socket attached to a shaft and cylindrical handle and is similar in appearance and use to a screwdriver. They generally have a hollow shaft to accommodate a shank onto which a nut is threaded. They are typically used for lower torque applications than wrenches or ratchets and are frequently used in the appliance repair and electronics industries.

Variations include T-shaped handles for providing the operator with a better grip, ratcheting handles, sockets with recessed magnets for holding fasteners, and flex shafts for bending around obstructions.

A spinner handle is a shaft and handle with a drive fitting—most commonly  square axle at the end for attaching interchangeable sockets. This allows one to use a single handle with a number of sizes instead of having a separate nut driver for each size. However, a spinner lacks the benefit of a hollow shaft; thus, a common alternative system is a single handle with interchangeable shafts in each size.

See also 
Socket wrench
Can wrench

References 

Mechanical hand tools